A - B - C - D - E - F - G - H - I - J - K - L - M - N - O - P - Q - R - S - T - U - V - W - XYZ

This is a list of rivers in the United States that have names starting with the letter E.  For the main page, which includes links to listings by state, see List of rivers in the United States.

Ea 
Eagle Creek - Arizona
Eagle River - Alaska
Eagle River - Colorado
Eagle River - Michigan
Eagle River - Wisconsin
Eagle Hill River - Massachusetts
East River - Florida
East River - New York
East River - Tidewater Virginia
East River - Virginia, West Virginia (tributary of New River)
East River - Wisconsin
East Bay River - Florida
East Branch Dead Diamond River - New Hampshire
East Branch Delaware River - New York
East Branch Pecatonica River - Wisconsin
East Branch Pemigewasset River - New Hampshire
East Branch Saco River - New Hampshire
East Brookfield River - Massachusetts
East Canada Creek - New York
East Fork River - Alabama
East Gallatin River - Montana
East Nishnabotna River - Iowa
East Twin River - Wisconsin
East Verde River - Arizona
East Walker River - Nevada, California
Eau Claire River - Wisconsin (tributary of Chippewa River)
Eau Claire River - Wisconsin (tributary of St. Croix River)
Eau Claire River - Wisconsin (tributary of Wisconsin River)
Eau Galle River - Wisconsin
Eau Gallie River - Florida
Eau Pleine River, see Big Eau Pleine River and Little Eau Pleine River - Wisconsin

Ec - Ek 
Econfina River - Florida
Econlockhatchee River - Florida
Ecorse River - Michigan
Edisto River - South Carolina
Edwards River - Illinois
Eek River - Alaska
Eel River - California
Eel River (Wabash River) - Indiana
Eel River (White River) - Indiana
Eel River - Massachusetts
Egegik River - Alaska
Egypt River - Massachusetts
Eightmile River - Connecticut
Eklutna River - Alaska

El 
Ela River - New Hampshire
Eleven Point River - Missouri, Arkansas
Elizabeth River - New Jersey
Elizabeth River - Virginia
Elk Creek - Pennsylvania
Elk Creek - West Virginia
Elk Fork - West Virginia
Elk River - Kansas
Elk River - Maryland
Elk River - Michigan
Elk River - Minnesota
Elk River - Missouri, Oklahoma
Elk River - North Carolina, Tennessee
Elk River - Oregon
Elk River - Tennessee, Alabama
Elk River - West Virginia
Elk River - Wisconsin
Elkhart River - Indiana
Elkhorn River - Nebraska
Ellicott Creek - New York
Ellis River - Maine
Ellis River - New Hampshire
Elm River - Illinois
Elm Fork Red River - Oklahoma
Elwha River - Washington

Em - Ex 
Embarras River - Illinois
Embarrass River - Wisconsin
Emory River - Tennessee
Encampment River - Wyoming
Endicott River - Alaska
English River - Iowa
Eno River - North Carolina
Enoree River - South Carolina
Entiat River - Washington
Escalante River - Utah
Escambia River - Florida
Escanaba River - Michigan
Escatawpa River - Alabama, Mississippi
Esopus Creek - New York
Espenberg River - Alaska
Estero River - Florida
Estrella River - California
Etivluk River -  Alaska
Etowah River - Georgia
Evitts Creek - Pennsylvania, Maryland
Exeter River - New Hampshire

E